Pentir is a community and electoral ward in the county of Gwynedd, Wales, and is 124 miles (199.9 km) from Cardiff and 205 miles (329.4 km) from London. In 2011 the population of Pentir was 2450 with 58.7% of them able to speak Welsh. It includes the Penrhosgarnedd suburbs of Bangor, Glasinfryn, Caerhun and the hamlet of Pentir.

The Faenol Hall (Vaenol Estate) is a Grade II* Listed Building within the community, as well as a number of other buildings on the estate, e.g., Chapel of St. Mary.

References

See also
Pentire, Cornwall
List of localities in Wales by population

 
Communities in Gwynedd
Gwynedd electoral wards